The women's 5000 metres at the 2014 IPC Athletics European Championships was held at the Swansea University Stadium from 18–23 August. Only a final event was contested; no heats events were contested.

Medalists

Results

T54
Final

See also
List of IPC world records in athletics

References

5000 metres
2014 in women's athletics
5000 metres at the World Para Athletics European Championships